The Hudspeth Formation is a Cretaceous sedimentary rock formation, found in Oregon of the United States of America. The formation dates to the Albian age of the Early Cretaceous period. During the Albian much of this formation was submerged beneath shallow seas resulting in the preservation of many marine fossils. Pterosaur, dinosaur and marine fossils have been recovered from the formation. It is intertongued with the Gable Creek Formation.

Fossil content

Vertebrates

Ammonites

Other invertebrates

See also 
 List of pterosaur-bearing stratigraphic units
 Paleontology in Oregon

References

Bibliography 

 
 
 
 

Geologic formations of Oregon
Cretaceous geology of Oregon
Lower Cretaceous Series of North America
Albian Stage
Mudstone formations
Shale formations
Shallow marine deposits
Paleontology in Oregon
Formations
Formations